Sergy is a commune in the Ain department in eastern France.

History
At the time of Roman occupation under Julius Caesar, a certain Sergius was rewarded with land - over time a small village developed around his home.  Sergy was under Roman control for 464 years.

In the Middle Ages, the Sergier family administered Sergy until 1533.  This family also founded a chapel.

In 1536, the Pays de Gex was invaded by the Bernese, and Protestantism was imposed by the de Martine family. The Sergier church became the Religionnaires temple.

In 1589, the Genevese took possession of the area, and in 1600 it became part of Catholic France. The temple in Sergy remained a Protestant church.

In 1685, the king forbade the reformed Protestant religion, and the temple was destroyed.  In need of money, the de Martine family mortgaged Sergy, which was divided into "Sergy haut" (high Sergy) and "Sergy bas" (low Sergy). The castle, situated towards the lower end of the village, was in very bad condition when the Genevan family, the Buissons, became the owners in 1755.

In 1779, Pierre Pictet (the husband of a member of the Buisson family) became lord of Sergy until the French revolution.  During this period, a church was built in the lower village.  This is the same church as is found in Sergy today.

The "haut" and "bas" division remains today, and while lower Sergy stretches toward the border of St.Genis-Pouilly to the South, the northern edge of high Sergy meets the foot of the Jura Mountains (a sub-alpine mountain range that traces the France-Switzerland border).

Population

See also
Communes of the Ain department

References

Communes of Ain
Ain communes articles needing translation from French Wikipedia